SKAMP is a Lithuanian pop band.

About SKAMP

SKAMP blends pop, rock, Hip Hop, and reggae genres. Skamp rose to fame in Lithuania in May 1998, with a cover of George Gershwin's Summertime. The song was a success in Lithuania,  and the band went on to release six studio albums. The members have also pursued several independent projects. SKAMP have supported several world-famous artists and groups; such as The Black Eyed Peas, Wheatus, Bomfunk MCs.
Over the years the trio have garnered many awards including Best Debut (1999), Best Band (2000, 2001,2004 & 2005) and Best Album (2000, 2001 & 2004). Erica has won "Best Female Artist" twice (2001 & 2002) and Vee received "Best Producer" in 2000. 
In 2007 the video, for their song "Reach", was premiered on the very first MTV BALTICS "Making The Video". MTV BALTICS first "MTV LIVE" show aired "SKAMP - Live&Deadly" (DVD) and it was the first time an entire week was dedicated to one band. 
2008 released their 6th studio album "Kazka" which spawned hits such as "Always Too Much", "Ten Kur Tu" and "Sportas".
Nominated for "BEST BALTIC ACT" at the MTV European Music Awards both in 2007 and 2008.

Eurovision
SKAMP appeared in the Eurovision Song Contest 2001 held in Copenhagen, Denmark with their song You Got Style. They finished in 13th place with 35 points which, at the time, was Lithuania's highest position in the contest until the Eurovision Song Contest 2006 when LT United finished in 6th. Victor Diawara was also a member of LT United.

Members
Erica Jennings – lyrics, vocals. She is of Irish nationality and speaks Lithuanian.
Victor "Vee" Diawara – producer, lyrics, vocals, guitar. He was born in Vilnius of a Malian father and a Lithuanian mother. He speaks fluent French and Lithuanian.
Vilius Alesius – lyrics, vocals

Discography

Studio albums
 Angata (1999, Koja Records Group) released in MC and CD
 Green (2000, Koja Records Group) released in MC and CD
 Le Boom-Chick (2000, Koja Records Group) released in MC and CD
 Skempinligė (2001, Koja Records Group) released in MC and CD
 Project: Tolerance (2001, Koja Records Group) released in MC and CD
 Reach (2004, Melodija Records / Tabami Records) released in CD
 Deadly (2005, Melodija Records / Tabami Records) released in CD
 Le Boom-Chick Vol.2 (2007, Melodija Records / Tabami Records) released in CD
 Kažką?! (2008, Tabami Records) released in CD

Live albums
 Live & Deadly (2007, Melodija Records / Tabami Records) released in CD

Singles
 Summertime (1998, Koja Records Group) released in MC 
 You Got Style (2001, Koja Records Group) released in MC and CD
 Musų Dienos Kaip Šventė (2002, Tabami Records) released in MC and CD
 Split The Atom (Na Na Na) (2004, Melodija Records) released in CD
 A Ka Guelen'2006 (2006, Melodija Records) released in CD

Video albums
 Live & Deadly (2007, Melodija Records / Tabami Records) released in DVD

Solo albums
 Erica Jennings Coming Home For Christmas (2002, Tabami Records) released in CD
 Willux Kelias, kuriuo aš einu (2003, Koja Records Group) released in MC and CD

Notable singles
Summertime  (1998)  released on MC single
Nieko Panašaus  featuring A.Mamontovas (1998) 
What We Gonna Leave  (2000)  from album Green (2000)
Fishy  featuring Psichas (2000) from album Lee Boom Chick(2000)
You Got Style  (2001)  released on CD&MC singles
Superstar  (2001)  from album Skempinligė (2001)
Mūsų Dienos Kaip Šventė featuring V.Kernagis (2002)  released on CD single
Split The Atom (Na Na Na)  (2004)  released on CD single
Calling After Me  (2004)  from album Reach (2004)
A Ka Guelen'2006  (2006)  released on CD single
Reach  featuring Pushas  (2007)
Revolution  featuring Kick Punch Gang  (2012)

Videos
Summertime  (1998)  
Nieko Panašaus featuring A.Mamontovas  (1998)  
You Got Style  (2001)  
Mūsų Dienos Kaip Šventė featuring V.Kernagis (2002)  
Calling After Me  (2004)  
L'attente  (2005)  
Reach featuring Pushas (2007)  
Always Too Much  (2008) 
Revolution featuring Kick Punch Gang (2012)

References

External links
 Official website

Eurovision Song Contest entrants for Lithuania
Lithuanian pop music groups
Eurovision Song Contest entrants of 2001